Llew Johnson (born 1 February 2000) is a New Zealand cricketer. He made his Twenty20 debut for Otago in the 2017–18 Super Smash on 2 January 2018. He made his List A debut on 21 December 2021, for Otago in the 2021–22 Ford Trophy.

References

External links
 

2000 births
Living people
New Zealand cricketers
Place of birth missing (living people)
Otago cricketers